The 1997–98 season of the FA Women's Premier League was the 7th season of the former top flight of English women's association football.

National Division

External links
Source

Eng
women
FA Women's National League seasons
1